Patrick St. Lawrence House, also known as the Yellow House, is a historic home located at Pittsboro, Chatham County, North Carolina.  It was built about 1787, and is a two-story, five bay, Federal / Greek Revival style frame dwelling with a low gable roof. It was originally built as an inn and overlooked the courthouse square.  It is Pittsboro's oldest building.  It was moved to its present site in 1955.

It was listed on the National Register of Historic Places in 1982.  It is located in the Pittsboro Historic District.

References

Houses on the National Register of Historic Places in North Carolina
Federal architecture in North Carolina
Greek Revival houses in North Carolina
Houses completed in 1787
Houses in Chatham County, North Carolina
National Register of Historic Places in Chatham County, North Carolina
Pittsboro, North Carolina
1787 establishments in North Carolina
Individually listed contributing properties to historic districts on the National Register in North Carolina